The Week That Wasn't is an Indian satirical late night television programme hosted by Cyrus Broacha and shown on the CNN-IBN (now CNN News18) channel. Started in 2006, cast includes Kaneez Surka, Gopal Datt, Ambika Vas and Kunal Vijaykar besides Broacha.

In 2013, a defamation case was filed against Broacha and the team by the Tamil Nadu government over his comments during the show regarding Jayalalithaa's letter to the Prime Minister asking Sri Lankan players not to be allowed in the Indian Premier League (IPL).

See also
On Air With AIB
Fake or Not

References

External links
  on  CNN-News18

Indian comedy television series
Political satirical television series
2010s television news shows
2020s television news shows
News parodies
Current affairs shows
Television news in India
Entertainment news shows
Indian political television series